Chikkolee is a spicy wheat dish common in southern Andhra Pradesh and parts of Maharashtra. It is made in a manner similar to rothi (chapathi) after it is cut into pieces and served with addition of spices. This is a traditional pudding of Rangrez, Bhavasara Kshatriya. It is a semi-liquid with crushed wheat, and meat pieces may be added. It can also be served as a snack.

Ingredients
It consists of wheat flour, salt, water, ginger paste, tamarind slices, and masala.

See also

 List of Indian breads

References

Andhra cuisine
Wheat dishes
Indian breads